Pottimuthyala Ramesh Kumar (born 13 July 1964) is an Indian former cricketer. He played five first-class matches for Hyderabad between 1989 and 1993.

See also
 List of Hyderabad cricketers

References

External links
 

1964 births
Living people
Indian cricketers
Hyderabad cricketers
Cricketers from Hyderabad, India